The women's hammer throw at the 2018 Commonwealth Games, as part of the athletics programme, took place in the Carrara Stadium on 10 April 2018.

The pre-event Commonwealth leader, Sophie Hitchon of England, exited the competition early with three foul throws.

Records
Prior to this competition, the existing world and Games records were as follows:

Schedule
The schedule was as follows:

All times are Australian Eastern Standard Time (UTC+10)

Results
With eleven entrants, the event was held as a straight final.

Final

References

Women's hammer throw
2018
2018 in women's athletics